The Arrondissement of Maaseik is one of the three administrative arrondissements in the Province of Limburg, Belgium. It is not a judicial arrondissement. The municipalities of Bocholt, Bree, Kinrooi, Meeuwen-Gruitrode, Dilsen-Stokkem and Maaseik, are part of the Judicial Arrondissement of Tongeren, while the rest of its municipalities are part of the Judicial Arrondissement of Hasselt.

History
The arrondissement was created in 1839 to form the Belgian part of the former arrondissement of Roermond, which ceased to exist due to the splitting of Limburg. The canton of Peer was also moved from the arrondissement of Hasselt to the new arrondissement of Maaseik.

Per 1 January 2019, the municipalities of Overpelt and Neerpelt were merged into the new municipality of Pelt, and Meeuwen-Gruitrode and Opglabbeek (a municipality in the arrondissement of Hasselt) were merged into Oudsbergen.

Municipalities
The Administrative Arrondissement of Maaseik consists of the following municipalities:
Bocholt
Bree
Dilsen-Stokkem
Hamont-Achel
Hechtel-Eksel
Houthalen-Helchteren
Kinrooi
Lommel
Maaseik
Oudsbergen
Pelt
Peer

References 

Maaseik